Erik Benjamin Jones  (born May 30, 1996) is an American professional stock car racing driver. He competes full-time in the NASCAR Cup Series, driving the No. 43 Chevrolet Camaro ZL1 for Legacy Motor Club. His nicknames are EJ, his initials, and That Jones Boy, given to him by announcer Ken Squier. Until 2021, Jones had spent his entire NASCAR and ARCA career with Toyota, and while in their driver development program, he won the 2015 NASCAR Camping World Truck Series championship.

Racing career

Early career and short track racing

Jones began his racing career at the age of seven, in quarter-midget racing; he began racing stock cars at age 13, and began competing in the ASA Late Model Series in 2010, becoming the youngest-ever winner of the Oktoberfest race at LaCrosse Fairgrounds Speedway. Moving to the Champion Racing Association's CRA All-Star Tour in 2011, he won the series championship in his rookie year; Jones also was the winner of that year's Governor's Cup 200 late model race at New Smyrna Speedway, leading every lap of the event; he was the first driver not born in the state of Florida to achieve that feat in over thirty years.

Jones moved to the ARCA Racing Series for the 2012 season, becoming the first-ever driver to compete in the series at the age of 15; competing in 10 of the series' 19 races (he was not eligible at tracks longer than one mile), he posted a best finish of third at Winchester Speedway and Berlin Raceway. In December of that year, Jones held off NASCAR Sprint Cup Series driver Kyle Busch to win the prestigious Snowball Derby.

In December 2013, Jones was named the winner of the 2013 Snowball Derby after the original winner, Chase Elliott, was disqualified after post-race inspections revealed a piece of tungsten in his car.

NASCAR

Truck Series

2013

In March 2013, Kyle Busch Motorsports announced that it had signed Jones to drive in five age-eligible Camping World Truck Series races in the team's No. 51 Toyota Tundra, driving at Martinsville Speedway, Rockingham Speedway and Iowa Speedway, as NASCAR relaxed the "Kyle Busch Rule" in that series where the minimum age was reduced from 18 to 16 at ovals shorter than 2,000 meters and road courses. Jones finished second in his third career start in the series at Iowa. In October, Jones added another prestigious late model trophy to his collection, winning the Winchester 400.

On November 8, 2013, Jones became the youngest driver ever to win in the history of NASCAR's top-level competition to that time, winning the Lucas Oil 150 at Phoenix International Raceway over Ross Chastain at the age of 17 years, five months and eight days.

2014
In January 2014 it was announced that Jones would return to KBM in the Truck Series for 2014, competing in all age-eligible events and selected longer track events after he turned 18. On July 11, at Iowa Speedway, Jones dueled Ryan Blaney and ultimately held him off for the win. On September 13, at Chicagoland Speedway, Jones qualified for Kyle Busch, who would later go on and win the race. On September 27, Jones won at Las Vegas Motor Speedway for his first longer track win. On November 7, Jones picked up his 4th career Truck Series win under the red flag at Phoenix, due to a power outage.

2015
On November 6, 2014, it was announced that Jones would run the full 2015 season in the Trucks for KBM, his first age-eligible season racing for a championship, as well as running an increased slate of races for Joe Gibbs Racing in the Xfinity Series.

In 2015, Jones started his season strong with a 2nd place finish at Daytona International Speedway. At Kansas Speedway, Jones would pick up his first pole of the season. In June, Jones would qualify well, winning pole position at Texas Motor Speedway, Gateway Motorsports Park, and Iowa Speedway. In the same race at Iowa, Jones would score his first win of the 2015 season.

In August, Jones would win the pole for the Pocono Mountains 150 at Pocono Raceway. In the same month, Jones would score his second win of the season at Canadian Tire Motorsports Park, gaining the points lead for the first time in his career after Tyler Reddick, the points leader entering the race, got into a wreck. After a string of top-ten finishes, Jones picked up win number three on the season at Texas Motor Speedway, extending his point lead over Crafton. Jones battled with defending champion Matt Crafton and Reddick during the 2015 season and beat them to win the Championship.

2016
In 2016, Jones would return to KBM to run a single race at Gateway Motorsports Park. Jones would end up finishing 5th after starting the race in 6th.

2018
Jones would again return to KBM for a single race in 2018, this time racing at Pocono Raceway. He would finish in 2nd place behind his teammate and truck owner, Kyle Busch.

2020
In 2020, Jones joined a partnership between Wauters Motorsports and former team owners James Finch and Billy Ballew to run the Truck race at Homestead–Miami Speedway. The effort was spurred by a bounty from Kevin Harvick and Marcus Lemonis for full-time Cup drivers who could beat Busch in a Truck race. The COVID-19 pandemic resulted in the plan shifting to Charlotte Motor Speedway, but Jones was excluded from the 40-truck field as the No. 5 had no points in the owner's standings.

Xfinity Series

2014

On June 19, 2014, Joe Gibbs Racing announced that Jones will run three races with the team's No. 20 in the Nationwide Series after he became age-eligible. Jones would make his Nationwide Series debut a month later in the EnjoyIllinois.com 300 at Chicagoland Speedway. He would finish in the top ten in all three races.

2015
In 2015, Jones ran 25 races in the renamed Xfinity Series, splitting the No. 20 and No. 54 Toyotas for JGR. On April 10, 2015, Jones won his first Xfinity Series race at Texas Motor Speedway in the No. 20. Later in the year, Jones completed a weekend sweep, winning at Iowa in the Truck Series for the first time in 2015 and at Chicagoland in the Xfinity Series in the No. 54, battling Ryan Blaney for his second career Xfinity Series win.

2016
Jones started racing full-time in the Xfinity Series for JGR in 2016, driving the No. 20. Jones won his first race of the season at Bristol in April, holding off Kyle Larson and Kyle Busch on a late restart. He also won the $100,000 Dash 4 Cash bonus by being the highest finishing Xfinity Series regular out of the four who qualified through the heat races. Jones won for the second time in 2016 at Dover in May, again winning the $100,000 Dash 4 Cash bonus. Jones then set the fastest time in qualifying for the Hisense 4K TV 300, winning the 9th straight pole for JGR. At Iowa in July, Jones scored his third win of the season, leading the most laps and passing Ty Dillon for the lead with 15 laps to go. Jones won for the fourth time at Chicagoland in September, taking the lead with 10 laps to go. With this win, Jones entered the Chase as the number one seed. Jones advanced through the Chase to the championship round at Homestead, where he would finish 4th in points behind Daniel Suárez, Elliott Sadler, and Justin Allgaier.

2017
In 2017, as he began racing full-time in the Cup Series, Jones ran a part-time Xfinity schedule. In April, he won back-to-back races at Texas and Bristol. In June, Jones joined Fox NASCAR Cup drivers-only coverage of the Xfinity race at Pocono, working as a pit reporter alongside Ryan Blaney and Ricky Stenhouse Jr.

2019
Jones drove the XCI Racing No. 81 Toyota at the 2019 Food City 300 at Bristol, where he finished 37th after being involved in a multi-car pileup with Christopher Bell, Cole Custer, and Joey Logano.

2021
On August 2, 2021, it was announced that Jones would return to the Xfinity Series to run the race at Watkins Glen in the No. 31 for Jordan Anderson Racing. This was his first start in the series since leaving JGR and Toyota.

Cup Series

2015

Jones unofficially debuted in the Sprint Cup Series during the 2015 Food City 500, when he relieved Denny Hamlin in the No. 11 due to Hamlin's neck spasms. After taking over the car, which had been in fifth, he dropped to 37th for the restart, and despite falling to the point where he was two laps down, Jones managed to finish the race in 26th. Since Hamlin started the race, he was credited with the 26th-place finish.

It was then announced that he would drive the No. 18 Toyota Camry for Kyle Busch, who was recovering from a leg injury, at Kansas. In his official debut, Jones qualified 12th and ran as high as first before crashing while running fourth. Jones ended up finishing 40th, 25 laps down.

Jones made his first career "triple duty" by running all three national series at the November Texas and Phoenix races. On November 4, he was announced as the driver of JGR's No. 20 car following the suspension of Matt Kenseth for his incident with Joey Logano at the Martinsville race the previous week. Jones finished 12th after blowing a tire late at Texas Motor Speedway. He drove the car again at Phoenix International Raceway to a 19th-place finish.

2017: Furniture Row

For 2016, he originally was planned to drive several races with JGR's fifth car. However, due to the charter system, which limits an owner to just four cars without any exception for rookie drivers, his Cup plans were put on hold. 

On August 7, 2016 it was announced that Jones had signed a deal with Furniture Row Racing to drive in their new No. 77 car sponsored by 5-hour Energy for the 2017 Monster Energy NASCAR Cup Series season. 

On August 19, 2017 Jones dominated at Bristol, winning his first Cup Series pole and dominated early, but lost the lead late in the race to Kyle Busch, who would go on to win while Jones finished second. Jones led 260 laps in the race after leading only 50 in his 26 prior starts in the series.

2018: First Cup win

On July 11, 2017, it was announced that Jones would make the long-anticipated move to the JGR No. 20 car full-time in 2018, replacing Kenseth. This coincided with Furniture Row Racing's announcement that they would shut down the No. 77 team to focus on the No. 78 team with Martin Truex Jr., who would go on to win the 2017 MENCS Championship.

On July 7, 2018, Jones captured his first career Cup Series win at the 2018 Coke Zero Sugar 400 at Daytona International Speedway after going into overtime second alongside Truex Jr. but got a big push from Chris Buescher and held off Truex Jr. on the final lap. This win secured him in the Playoffs, but was eliminated in the Round of 16 after disastrous finishes at Las Vegas and the Charlotte Roval. Jones finished the season 15th in points.

2019: First Southern 500 victory

On September 2, 2019, Jones scored his second career Cup Series win at Darlington, securing him in the 2019 Playoffs. Four days later, he confirmed that he signed a contract extension with JGR to drive the No. 20 in 2020. Heading into the playoffs, Jones started 26th at Las Vegas, and worked his way up to the top 10 by the end of Stage 1. During the race, Jones had reported his throttle was stuck and had to go behind the wall. He returned to the track 16 laps down, Jones ultimately finished 36th, 26 points from the cutoff line. At Richmond, Jones ran top 10 in the latter part of the night and was able to finish 4th, but was disqualified when his car was discovered to have a rear-wheel alignment issue during post-race inspection. He left Richmond 45 points down from the cutoff line. Jones was in a must-win situation heading to the Charlotte Roval. However coming to a restart, Jones was involved in a multi-car incident heading into turn 1. The damage was significant enough to puncture his radiator and eliminate him from the Round of 16.

2020: Final season at JGR
Jones kicked off 2020 by winning the Busch Clash; despite being involved in three accidents towards the end of the race, further wrecks among the field led to multiple overtime attempts. On the third overtime, Jones received a push from Hamlin on the final lap to win. In August 2020, after fellow Toyota team Leavine Family Racing announced the sale of their team, it was announced that JGR would be parting ways with Jones at season's end, ending a long-time relationship that dated back to 2012. Jones would end up missing the playoffs after being involved in a wreck at Daytona, a race he would need to win to lock himself in. Jones would go winless for the first time since his rookie season in 2017 and finish 17th in points.

2021: First season with Petty
On October 21, 2020, Jones was confirmed to drive the Richard Petty Motorsports No. 43 entry in 2021, replacing Bubba Wallace.

2022: Second Southern 500 victory

On August 22, 2021, it was revealed that Jones would remain in the No. 43 for the 2022 season as he will be sponsored by FocusFactor in 26 races. RPM was eventually purchased by GMS Racing to form Petty GMS, and Jones was joined by Ty Dillon as teammate. At Fontana, Jones scored his first top five since 2020 by finishing third. Prior to the Pocono race, the No. 43 was docked 35 driver and owner points for an L1 penalty when the pre-race inspection revealed issues on the car's rocker box vent hole. Despite not making the playoffs, Jones won at Darlington, giving Petty GMS its first win. In addition, he gave the No. 43 its first win since 2014 and its overall 200th win. Jones ended the season 18th in the points standings.

Personal life
Jones, born May 30, 1996 in Byron, Michigan, is a graduate of Swartz Creek High School. Jones received his high school diploma at Texas Motor Speedway before the WinStar World Casino 400K Camping World Truck Series race on June 6, 2014.

He currently lives in Cornelius, North Carolina. He has a younger sister, Lindsey. Jones is also an avid reader; he started a series on Facebook in April 2020 called Erik's Reading Circle where he reads various children's books and takes suggestions for books to read in the following weeks. He also hosts a book club called Erik's Reading Circle on his website.

He has been dating dirt track racer Holly Shelton since 2018.

Motorsports career results

NASCAR
(key) (Bold – Pole position awarded by time. Italics – Pole position earned by points standings or practice time. * – Most laps led.)

Cup Series

Daytona 500

Xfinity Series

Gander RV & Outdoors Truck Series

K&N Pro Series East

K&N Pro Series West

 Season still in progress
 Ineligible for series driver points

ARCA Racing Series
(key) (Bold – Pole position awarded by qualifying time. Italics – Pole position earned by points standings or practice time. * – Most laps led.)

References
Notes

Citations

External links

Official profile at Legacy Motor Club

Living people
1996 births
People from Shiawassee County, Michigan
Racing drivers from Michigan
NASCAR Truck Series champions
ARCA Menards Series drivers
ARCA Midwest Tour drivers
People from Cornelius, North Carolina
Kyle Busch Motorsports drivers
Joe Gibbs Racing drivers